Rise to Dominate is the second studio album by the Swedish band Aeon, released on September 4, 2007.

Track listing

Personnel 
Aeon
 Tommy Dahlström – vocals
 Zeb Nilsson – guitar
 Daniel Dlimi – guitar
 Nils Fjellstrom – drums
 Max Carlberg – bass

Production
 Production – Aeon and Marcus Edvardsson
 Recorded at Empire Studio in Östersund, Sweden; April 2007
 Engineering – Marcus Edvardsson, Joakim Staaf and Aeon
 Mixing/mastering – Dan Swanö at Unisound; May 2007
 Cover artwork and layout – Daniel Dlimi

References

2007 albums
Aeon (band) albums
Metal Blade Records albums